Miss Malaysia Universe 1971, the 5th edition of the Miss Universe Malaysia, was held on 12 June 1971 at the Merlin Hotel, Kuala Lumpur. Yvette Batterman of Selangor was crowned by the outgoing titleholder, Josephine Wong of Perak at the end of the event. She then represented Malaysia at the Miss Universe 1971 pageant in Miami, Florida.

Results

Delegates

References

External links 

1971 in Malaysia
1971 beauty pageants
1971
Beauty pageants in Malaysia